The Capua leg is an artificial leg, found in a grave in Capua, Italy. Dating from 300 BC, the leg is one of the earliest known prosthetic limbs. The limb was kept at the Royal College of Surgeons in London, but was destroyed in World War II during an air raid. A copy of the limb is held at the Science Museum, London.

Bibliography
Von Brunn, Walther: Der Stelzfuß von Capua und die antiken Prothesen. In: Archiv für Geschichte der Medizin. Vol. 18, No. 4 (1. November 1926). Stuttgart: Steiner, 1926, pp. 351–360. 
Bliquez, Lawrence J.: Prosthetics in Classical Antiquity: Greek, Etruscan, and Roman Prosthetics. In: Haase, Wolfgang; Temproini, Hildegard (ed.): Aufstieg und Niedergang der römischen Welt. Teil II: Principat, Vol. 37.3. Berlin / New York: De Gruyter, 1996, pp. 2640–2676.

References

Prosthetics
Archaeological artifacts